Kamani Helekunihi Hill (born December 28, 1985) is an American former professional soccer player who played as a forward or winger.

Early years 
Hill was born in Berkeley, California to a Trinidadian father and an American mother of Hawaiian origin. He grew up playing in various Bay Area youth leagues and attended Berkeley High School, where he was a star forward on their soccer team. He then attended UCLA, where he played in 40 games (32 starts), scored nine goals, and assisted on 13 more in his two seasons with the team. During his college years he also played with Orange County Blue Star and San Fernando Valley Quakes in the USL Premier Development League.

Professional career

Europe
At the beginning of October 2006, Hill went to Germany for a trial with Bundesliga team VfL Wolfsburg, and in November he signed a -year contract with the team. He made his first-team debut on January 27, 2007 as a substitute in a 2–1 defeat away at Hertha BSC Berlin. However, after a promising start, the arrival of coach Felix Magath at the club saw Hill relegated to the second team, where he spent most of his time at Wolfsburg. During November 2008, he trained with Norwegian club FK Bodø/Glimt. However, he was not offered a contract. In April 2009, he began a ten-day trial with Vitoria Guimaraes upon the recommendation of his Wolfsburg teammate Alex, and on May 8 the club announced his signing to a three-year contract.

Hill was released by Vitória Guimarães in July 2010.

United States
Hill returned to the United States to train with Major League Soccer club San Jose Earthquakes.
Hill signed with Major League Soccer club Colorado Rapids on March 28, 2012.

International career 
Hill played for the United States U20 national team in the Suwon Youth Tournament in South Korea in 2005, where he scored a game-winning goal against Argentina.

He later made his debut for the senior United States senior national team on June 2, 2007 as a substitute in a 4–1 friendly match victory over China in San Jose, California. Hill made his second and final appearance coming on as a substitute for Landon Donovan in a 1–0 friendly loss to Sweden in Gothenburg, Sweden on August 22, 2007.

References

External links 
 
 
 

1985 births
Living people
Berkeley High School (Berkeley, California) alumni
UCLA Bruins men's soccer players
Orange County Blue Star players
San Fernando Valley Quakes players
VfL Wolfsburg players
VfL Wolfsburg II players
Vitória S.C. players
C.D. Aves players
Colorado Rapids players
American expatriate soccer players
American expatriate soccer players in Germany
Expatriate footballers in Portugal
USL League Two players
Bundesliga players
Primeira Liga players
Major League Soccer players
United States men's international soccer players
Soccer players from Berkeley, California
United States men's under-20 international soccer players
United States men's under-23 international soccer players
American sportspeople of Trinidad and Tobago descent
American people of Native Hawaiian descent
Native Hawaiian sportspeople
Association football forwards
Association football wingers
American soccer players